The Guangzhou Power was a professional arena football team based in Guangzhou, Guangdong. They were members of the China Arena Football League (CAFL).

Seasons

References

External links
 China Arena Football League official website

 
China Arena Football League teams
2016 establishments in China
Sport in Guangzhou
American football teams established in 2016